"Sonnet" is a song by the English rock band the Verve and is featured on their third album, Urban Hymns. It was released 2 March 1998 as the final single from the album. The song has the same instrumental layout as "The Drugs Don't Work", consisting of acoustic and electric guitars backed up with a string section which is mainly made up of violins.

At the start of 1998, Hut wanted to release another single from the album, an idea which the band disagreed with. Unusually, Hut pressed them on this matter, and so the band finally agreed to release "Sonnet", but only in a format that would make it ineligible for chart recognition. Consequently, "Sonnet" was released as part of a set of four 12-inch records (backed by "Stamped", "So Sister" and "Echo Bass").

The release of "Sonnet" was limited to just 5,000 copies, despite the huge radio coverage it received, and the official chart refused to recognize it as a single because of the extra content, as planned. The pack was released in a cardboard mailer, and the preceding three singles from the album, all were re-released on the same day, fitted into the mailer. However, sales of an imported format resulted in it charting in the United Kingdom at number 74. The song also charted in Australia, Iceland, and New Zealand, reaching numbers 83, 4, and 43, respectively.

Music video
The music video is set in a large car park. An "Exit" sign written in Russian can be seen in the background. The rest of the video consists of repeated close-ups of singer Richard Ashcroft sitting in a chair, with different backgrounds each time.

Track listing
 European CD and 12-inch single 
 Australian and Japanese CD single 
 "Sonnet"
 "Stamped"
 "So Sister"
 "Echo Bass"

Charts

Weekly charts

Year-end charts

Certifications

In popular culture
"Sonnet" appeared on the MTV animated series Daria in the first episode of the third season, when she starts thinking about using contact lenses.

The song was also featured during the opening of the sixth episode of the first season of the show Ted Lasso.

References

The Verve songs
1997 songs
1998 singles
Hut Records singles
Songs written by Richard Ashcroft